Thor Freudenthal (born 20 October 1972) is a German film director, screenwriter, animator and special effects artist best known for his work on Diary of a Wimpy Kid and Percy Jackson: Sea of Monsters.

Life and career
Freudenthal was raised in Berlin, Germany. His parents were born in Israel. He credits his early interest in cinema to Steven Spielberg, saying "When my mother told me he's Jewish, and he goes to synagogue, it was like, 'My God, we're of the same tribe, and he's a huge hero of mine.' And then seeing the Schindler movie actually made me feel more secure in who I was myself." His family's connection to Spielberg became real when his Polish-Jewish grandparents, survivors of the Holocaust who had known Schindler personally, were asked to appear in the final scene of the movie.

Freudenthal attended the Hochschule der Künste Berlin, and later moved to Southern California as an exchange student at CalArts. He started out as an animation director, and found success as a director in his first live-action film, Motel, which played at Sundance Film Festival in 2005. He also worked on conceptal/visual art work at Sony Pictures Imageworks on films like Stuart Little, The ChubbChubbs! and Stuart Little 2. He later worked as second unit director on Disney's The Haunted Mansion. In 2009, he directed Hotel for Dogs for DreamWorks Pictures. He directed the live-action/animated feature film, Diary of a Wimpy Kid, based on the book by Jeff Kinney and in 2013 he directed Percy Jackson: Sea of Monsters.

In 2019, he was reported to have signed on to direct upcoming Gotham Group series Skywatchers. In 2020, he directed Words on Bathroom Walls, a drama film starring Charlie Plummer and Taylor Russell, about a teenager struggling with schizophrenia; the film was well-reviewed.

Freudenthal has also directed multiple episodes of Arrow and one episode of The Flash.

Filmography

Film

Television

Short films

Other credits

References

External links

1972 births
Jewish American screenwriters
German emigrants to the United States
Mass media people from Berlin
Place of birth missing (living people)
20th-century German Jews
Living people
German people of Israeli descent
German people of Jewish descent
German people of Polish-Jewish descent
21st-century American Jews